Dokuzuncu hariciye kogusu is a 1967 Turkish romantic drama film directed by Nejat Saydam based on a novel by Peyami Safa. The film stars Kartal Tibet and Hülya Koçyiğit

Cast
Kartal Tibet ...Burhan 
Hülya Koçyiğit ...Nüzhet 
Muzaffer Tema  
Tunç Oral  
Aliye Rona   
Müserref Çapin   
Ibrahim Delideniz   
Ufuk Enünlü   
Renan Fosforoğlu   
Asim Nipton   
Yavuz Selekman   
Tuncay Toron   
Ismail Varol   
Lamia Yal   
Necabettin Yal

External links

1967 films
1960s Turkish-language films
1967 romantic drama films
Films set in Turkey
Turkish romantic drama films
Films based on Turkish novels
Turkish black-and-white films